Jeannot Volpé (born June 28, 1950) is a Canadian politician in the Province of New Brunswick.

Born in Saint-Jacques, New Brunswick, Volpé graduated from the University of Moncton in 1973 with a Bachelor of Physical Education degree and taught school until 1980. He was elected to the Legislative Assembly of New Brunswick in 1995 and re-elected in 1999, 2003 and 2006.

He represented the electoral district of Madawaska-les-Lacs and was a member of the cabinet from 1999 to 2006.  On December 19, 2006, he was elected interim leader of the Progressive Conservative Party of New Brunswick, he became leader of the opposition in the Legislature upon Bernard Lord's resignation from that role on January 31, 2007.

Volpé married former Progressive Conservative MLA and Cabinet Minister Kim Jardine, whom he met when he served in cabinet with her from 1999 to 2003, on May 19, 2007.

In May 2009, Volpé announced that he was not reoffering in the 2010 election.

In 2012, Volpe took the Government to the Human Rights Commission over a 1/3 cut in government pensions.

Notes

References
 

1950 births
Living people
Université de Moncton alumni
Canadian educators
Progressive Conservative Party of New Brunswick MLAs
Members of the Executive Council of New Brunswick
People from Madawaska County, New Brunswick
21st-century Canadian politicians
Finance ministers of New Brunswick